Nihonia australis, commonly named the Australian turrid, is a species of sea snail, a marine gastropod mollusk in the family Cochlespiridae.

The name Nihonia australis has often been attributed to Gmelin (1791:3542), as a result of a confusion between Murex australis Gmelin, 1791 [= Pelicaria vermis (Martyn, 1784)] and Pleurotoma australis Roissy, 1805 [= Nihonia australis]

Description
The size of an adult shell varies between 70 mm and 95 mm. The elongate-fusiform shell is yellowish white, encircled by raised, corded orange-brown ribs, with several intermediate striae. The blunt protoconch contains 1½ -2 whorls. The teleoconch contains 9½ -10 whorls. The outer lip is broadly rounded above into the rather shallow sinus. The long, straight siphonal canal is unnotched.

Distribution
This marine species occurs off Japan and Australia.

References

 Roissy (1805), Hist. Nat. Moll. Anim.. s.Vert, et sang, blanc. vol. 69, livraison 32, book 6, p. 72
 Valenciennes (1846), Atlas Voy. Venus, pl..5, f. 3. (non Lamarck, 1816).
 Casey (1904) Trans. Acad. Sci. St. Louis, vol. 14, no. 5, p. 151.
 Otuka (1959) Venus, vol. 20, no. 3, p. 246.
 Liu J.Y. [Ruiyu] (ed.). (2008). Checklist of marine biota of China seas. China Science Press. 1267 pp.

External links
 

australis
Gastropods described in 1805